Borines is one of 24 parishes (administrative divisions) in Piloña, a municipality within the province and autonomous community of Asturias, in northern Spain.

The population is 196 (INE 2015).

Villages and hamlets
 Borines 
 La Infiesta 
 Moñio
 Sieres 
 Viyao 
 Castañoso 
 El Escobal
 La Llama 
 El Mortorio 
 San Feliz 
 San Martin de Borines

References

Parishes in Piloña